Vojtěch Hadaščok (born 8 January 1992) is a Czech footballer currently playing for FK Přepeře in the Bohemian Football League B. He has represented the Czech Republic at youth level, and plays as a striker.

Playing career

Club career
Hadaščok arrived at Liberec in February 2011 and made his league debut against Jablonec on 27 February 2011.
He made his debut in the UEFA Champions League on the 17 July 2012 against FC Shakhter Karagandy. He scored in the 23rd minute.

International career
Hadaščok has represented his country at youth international level. He was part of Czech U-19 team on 2011 UEFA EURO U-19, where Czech were runners-up.

References

External links
 
 
 Guardian Football
 
 Vojtěch Hadaščok at Resultat

1992 births
Living people
Czech footballers
Czech Republic youth international footballers
Czech Republic under-21 international footballers
Czech First League players
Czech National Football League players
FC Slovan Liberec players
FC Hradec Králové players
FK Viktoria Žižkov players
1. FK Příbram players
FC Sellier & Bellot Vlašim players
FK Dukla Prague players
Sportspeople from Opava
Association football forwards
Bohemian Football League players